Melanoides victoriae is a species of a freshwater snail, a gastropod in the Thiaridae family.

Distribution 
The type locality is "the rapids above the Victoria Falls of the Zambezi", Zambezi River at Victoria Falls, Zimbabwe.

Distribution of Melanoides victoriae include:
 South Africa
 Zambezi River, Zimbabwe
 East Caprivi and Okavango River in north-eastern Namibia
 Cunene River

Description 
The width of the shell is 10 mm. The height of the shell is 29 mm.

References

Thiaridae
Gastropods described in 1865